Phyllocaulis variegatus is a species of land slug, a terrestrial pulmonate gastropod mollusk in the family Veronicellidae.

Description

Distribution
The distribution of Phyllocaulis variegatus includes:
 Brazil

Parasites 
This species is an intermediate host to:
 Brachylaima sp.

References

External links

Veronicellidae
Gastropods described in 1885